Commentaries on the Constitution of the United States is a three-volume work written by Associate Justice of the Supreme Court of the United States Joseph Story and published in 1833. In these Commentaries, Story defends the power of the national government and economic liberty. "My object will be," Story wrote, "sufficiently attained, if I shall have succeeded in bringing before the reader the true view of its powers, maintained by its founders and friends, and confirmed and illustrated by the actual practice of the government."

Contents

Dedication to John Marshall
Story dedicates his Commentaries to his friend and fellow Justice, Chief Justice John Marshall:

Preface
In his preface Story writes:

Story contrasts these commentaries to the writings of other commentators of the Constitution: "The reader must not expect to find in these pages any novel views and novel constructions of the Constitution. I have not the ambition to be the author of any new plan of interpreting the theory of the Constitution, or of enlarging or narrowing its powers by ingenious subtitlies and learned
doubts."

Book I

Perhaps following the example of Marshall's Life of Washington, Story begins his first book with a general history of the American colonies. Story has a chapter on Maine, but he does not have one on Vermont.

Book II
In the second book, Story discusses the history of the American Revolution and the Confederation, and highlights the shortcomings of the Articles of Confederation.

Book III
In the first three chapters of the third book, Story gives a short history of the origin and adoption of the United States Constitution, the objections to the Constitution, and the nature of the Constitution – whether it is a compact between sovereign states, or the supreme and national law of the United States. In Chapter 4, Story enters into a discourse on "who is the final judge, or interpreter, in Constitutional controversies." In Chapter 5, Story gives his nineteen rules of interpretation of the Constitution.

Chapters 6 through 43 deal with all the provisions of the original Constitution of the United States. Chapter 25 deals with the constitutionality of a national bank.
Chapter 26 deals with the authority of Congress to make roads, canals, and other internal improvements. Chapter 44 deals with the Amendments to the Constitution.

Chapter 45 contains Story's concluding remarks:

Justice Story added an appendix to the second volume of the 1833 edition where he quotes President Andrew Jackson's December 10, 1832 Proclamation which deals with South Carolina's Nullification Laws. This appendix appears at the end of the first volume of the second, third, fourth and fifth editions.

To the fourth edition, published in 1873 by Little, Brown & Co., Thomas M. Cooley added three chapters dealing with the emancipation of the slaves, the Fourteenth Amendment and impartial suffrage.

Editions
1833 – . In A Catalogue of Law Books, Published and for Sale by Charles C. Little and James Brown (1846), a copy of this edition was indicated to cost $12.00.
Volume I.
Volume II.
Volume III.
1851 – Second Edition, edited by Story's son, William Wetmore Story, Boston: Charles C. Little and James Brown.
Volume I.
Volume II.
1858 – Third Edition, by E. H. Bennett, Boston: Little, Brown and Company.
Volume I.
Volume II.
1873 – Fourth Edition, edited by Thomas Cooley, Boston: Little, Brown and Company. Two volumes. In John Parsons' Catalogue of Law Books (1880) a copy of this edition costs $12.00.
Volume I.
Volume II.
1891 – Fifth Edition, edited by Melville Bigelow, Boston: Little, Brown, and Company.

Abridgements
Story published an abridgement of his Commentaries "for the Use of Colleges and High Schools." In A Catalogue of Law Books, Published and for Sale by Charles C. Little and James Brown (1846), a copy of this abridgement was indicated to cost $3.00. Story's Abridgment may well have been even more influential than his three-volume work, because the Abridgment saw a much larger audience. The Abridgment was required reading at Harvard and in other academic settings.

Story published The Constitutional Class Book: being a brief exposition of the Constitution of the United States. Boston: Hilliard, Gray and Company, 1834.

A Familiar Exposition of the Constitution was published in Boston by Marsh, Capen, Lyon and Webb in 1840. Thomas Webb published an edition in 1842, and Harpers published many reprints starting in 1847.

Reception and enduring reputation
In correspondence Chancellor James Kent wrote to Story on June 19, 1833: "I have just now risen from the completion of that duty, and I owe it to you and to myself to say, that I have been delighted and instructed from the beginning to the end of the work. It is a most profound, learned, acute, and excellent production, distinguished for its accuracy, fulness, and judgment. Every topic is discussed in a masterly manner. It is complete and perfect throughout, and carries the head and heart captive through every page. It is written with admirable beauty and elegance of style, and under the glow and fervor of patriotism, eloquence, and truth."

Chief Justice John Marshall wrote to Story on July 31, 1833: "I have finished reading your great work, and wish it could be read by every statesman, and every would-be statesman in the United States. It is a comprehensive and an accurate commentary on our Constitution, formed in the spirit of the original text."

Robert von Mohl, of the University of Tübingen, speaking of it in the Kritische Zeitschrift, said: "We have in this work, as perfect and excellent a Commentary on the North American Public Law, as can be produced by deep and profound reflection, acute logic, extensive knowledge of the national condition and writings, and just political views. Professor Story, by his able and diligent labors, has, without doubt, done a great service, not only to his countrymen, but also, and in a still higher degree, to the European publicists, among whom his name will receive an honorable fame, as readily awarded as it will be enduring!"

Simon Greenleaf said: "This great work, ... admirable alike for its depth of research, its spirited illustrations, and its treasures of political wisdom, has accomplished all in this department which the friends of constitutional law and liberty could desire!

Reviews in the press were laudatory, especially the reviews in American Quarterly Review, The American Jurist, The American Monthly Review, and the North American Review.

Thomas M. Cooley, in his prefatory essay to his edition of William Blackstone's Commentaries on the Laws of England, wrote in 1871 "upon the subject of the federal constitution, no work yet supersedes the elaborate treatise of Mr. Justice Story; though if it were re-written in view of recent events and authorities, it might be made much more valuable, and be largely increased in interest to those who shall hereafter read it." Cooley himself edited and added chapters and notes to the fourth edition of Story's Commentaries.

This is not to say that Story's Commentaries met with universal approval. They were attacked by Southern writers such as Henry St. George Tucker, Sr., John Randolph Tucker, and Abel Parker Upshur. According to Kent Newmyer, "[t]hat Story was the focal point of Southern animus only testified to his prominence as the authority on the Constitution." H. Jefferson Powell, in "Joseph Story's Commentaries on the Constitution: A Belated Review" first published in the Yale Law Journal, quotes Upshur's opinion that the Commentaries were "mere dogmas", and John Calhoun's opinion that Story's Commentaries were essentially false and dangerous.

Reputation in the law
Story's Commentaries have been cited in hundreds of cases before state and federal courts where constitutional issues are decided.

References

External links

1833 non-fiction books
American political philosophy literature
United States constitutional commentary